Sculpture in Brussels is sculpture that has been created in Brussels, Belgium, since the Middle Ages to the present day. It began in the 14th and 15th centuries with Claus Sluter's arrival in Brussels and the construction of Brussels' Town Hall. Until the end of the Ancien Régime, sculptors in Brussels were members of the Quatre Couronnés Guild of the Nation of St Nicholas and then the Royal Academy of Fine Arts.

History
Brussels' sculpture began with the arrival of the Dutch sculptor Claus Sluter, who was probably trained in Brussels, where he was registered in 1379 on the register of the Corporation of Stonemasons under the name of Claes de Slutere van Herlamen, and who lived there from 1380 to 1385, before settling in Dijon (France). It continued without interruption and reached its momentum during 15th and 16th centuries.

Sculptors
Brussels had notable sculptors such as Jérôme Duquesnoy (I), François Duquesnoy, Jerôme Duquesnoy (II), Marc de Vos (1650–1717), Peter van Dievoet (1661–1729), Jan Cosijn, Cornelis van Nerven, Jan de Kinder, Jacques Bergé, Jean-Baptiste Fleuriot-Lescot (1761-year II, guillotined), Godecharle, and François Lejeune.

Gallery

See also
 Guilds of Brussels

Bibliography

Printed books

 Messager des sciences historiques, des arts et de la bibliographie de Belgique, Ghent, 1854: "Archives des Arts, des Sciences et des lettres, sculpteurs et sculptures, Noms des sculpteurs qui ont fait partie du métier des Quatre-Couronnés à Bruxelles, depuis 1621 à 1716". read online 
 Guillaume Des Marez, L'architecte Jean Van Ruysbroeck et le xve siècle Bruxellois, Brussels, 1923.
 J. Duverger, De Brusselsche steenbickeleren, beeldhouwers, bouwmeesters, metselaars enz. der xive en xve eeuw, Ghent, 1933.
 Annales de la Société royale d'archéologie de Bruxelles
 Brigitte D’Hainaut-Zveny, Miroirs du sacré. Les retables sculptés à Bruxelles. xve-xvie centuries, CFC-Éditions, Brussels, 2005,  ().

Manuscripts

 Notice des peintres, sculpteurs, architectes et graveurs, natifs de Bruxelles, avec la liste de leurs principaux ouvrages. Manuscript in-folio of 223 pages, from the library of Georges-Joseph Gérard, obtained by the government of The Netherlands and transposed at The Hague.

References

Notes

History of Brussels
Culture in Brussels